"Hurt" is a 1954 song by Jimmie Crane and Al Jacobs. "Hurt" was originally performed by Roy Hamilton, whose version peaked at number eight on the R&B Best Seller chart and spent a total of seven weeks on the chart. A version by Ricky Denell also received considerable radio airplay in 1954 on pop radio stations. The song is considered to be the signature hit of Timi Yuro, whose version went to number four on the Billboard pop chart in 1961. Juice Newton's 1985 version scored number one on Billboards Country chart.

Cover versions

In 1961, Timi Yuro's version of "Hurt" reached No. 4 on the Billboard Hot 100, while reaching No. 2 on Billboards Easy Listening chart and No. 22 on the R&B chart.
In 1964, Little Anthony and the Imperials recorded a version on their album,"Goin' Out Of My Head". This version was a chart hit, reaching #51 on the Billboard Hot 100, 2 years later (1966).
In 1967, Dalida - A qui? (Hurt).
In 1967, the Italian singer Fausto Leali had a personal triumph with a local version entitled "A chi" ("To whom"): it was the top record of the year in Italy.
In 1973, Bobby Vinton released a version of "Hurt". Vinton's version reached No. 1 in Flemish Belgium, while reaching No. 3 in the Netherlands, and No. 40 on Billboards Easy Listening chart. The song appeared in 1974 on his album With Love.
In 1976, Elvis Presley covered the song. Presley's version reached No. 28 on the Billboard Hot 100, while reaching No. 7 on Billboards Easy Listening chart, No. 6 on Billboards Hot Country Singles chart, and No. 37 on the UK Singles Chart. Rock critic Greil Marcus described his performance of that song as "apocalyptic", while fellow reviewer Dave Marsh said of it "If he felt the way he sounded, the wonder isn't that he had only a year left to live but that he managed to survive that long." He sang the song on stage 159 times, usually performing it with a reprise. In four of these instances, in Birmingham, Alabama (December 29 1976), Atlanta (December 30 1976) Pittsburgh (December 31 1976), and Chicago (May 1 1977), he ended it by going to the floor intentionally while simultaneously delivering a seven-second uninterrupted note.
The song was covered in Malay in 1976 by Black Dog Bone as "Luka".
In 1976, The Manhattans also covered the song in their album The Manhattans. Their version reached No. 10 on Billboards R&B chart, and No. 4 on the UK Singles Chart.
In 1981, Carly Simon covered the song on her Torch album and it was released as the only single.  Record World praised "Carly's striking vocal" and "Michael Brecker's fiery sax solo."
In 1986, Juice Newton had her third number-one country hit with her version of "Hurt." Newton's is the only version of "Hurt" to become a #1 hit in the United States.
In 1988, Peabo Bryson covered the song on his “Positive” album.
In 2000, Filipino Singer Mae Rivera made a Tagalog version titled Aray
In 2003 Italian singer Francesco De Gregori sings "A chi", cover of "Hurt" on the CD "Mix"
In 2015 Patrizio Buanne covered the song in an Italian/English version entitled A Chi (Hurt) for his album Viva la Dolce Vita.

References 

1954 songs
1954 singles
1961 singles
1973 singles
1976 singles
1985 singles
Little Anthony and the Imperials songs
Bobby Vinton songs
Elvis Presley songs
The Manhattans songs
Carly Simon songs
Juice Newton songs
Timi Yuro songs
Epic Records singles
RCA Records singles
Song recordings produced by Richard Landis
Songs written by Jimmie Crane
Songs written by Al Jacobs